Perino  is a surname. Notable people with the surname include:

 Dana Perino (born 1975), American press secretary and broadcaster
 Davide Perino (born 1981), Italian actor
 Elena Perino (born 1985), Italian actress
 Gregory Perino (died 2005), American archaeologist
 Luc Perino (born 1947), French physician, essayist, and novelist
 Maria Antonietta Perino, Italian aerospace engineer
 Mary Jo Perino, sports journalist
 Paolo Perino (born 1988), Italian male rower

See also 

 Perino (disambiguation)
 Pierini (surname)